Tise, Maharashtra is a small village in Raigad district, Maharashtra state in Western India. The 2011 Census of India recorded a total of 795 residents in the village.

Tise Kh. is a small village in the same region. The 2011 Census of India recorded a total of 389 residents in the village.

References

Villages in Ratnagiri district